EMEA is a shorthand designation meaning Europe, the Middle East and Africa. The acronym is used by institutions and governments, as well as in marketing and business when referring to this region: it is a shorthand way of referencing the two continents (Africa and Europe) and the Middle Eastern sub-continent all at once. It is particularly common among North American companies, and it is mostly used when dividing a company's operations by geography.

As the name suggests, the region includes all of the countries found on the continents of Africa and Europe, as well as the countries that make up the Middle East. The region is generally accepted to include all European nations and all African nations, and extends east to Iran, including part of Russia. Typically, the acronym does not include independent overseas territories of mainland countries in the region, such as French Guiana. However, the term is not completely clear, and while it usually refers to Europe, the Middle East and Africa, it is not uncommon for businesses and other institutions to slightly tweak the countries they include under this umbrella term.

One of the reasons why the term is commonly used is because it is useful for business purposes, as most of the region falls within four time zones, which facilitates communication and travel.

The related term "EAA" refers to "Europe, Africa, and Asia".

Historical influence
The historical influence and interdependence of Europe on the Middle East and Africa in relation to trade routes contributed to the development of the term EMEA. The establishment of the Suez Canal in 1869 impacted international commerce. It directly linked Europe to the Indian Ocean and East Asian trade routes. The direct channel between Britain and India enabled Britain to gradually gain authority over Egypt. This authority was reinforced via the development and maintenance of the Pax Britannica which gave Britain naval power and control over the world's maritime trade routes during the late nineteenth century period of peace.

Related regions
Eastern Europe, Middle East and Africa (EEMEA). Some companies separate their Eastern European business from the rest of Europe, and refer to the EEMEA region separately from the Western/Central European (EU/EFTA) region
Southern Europe, Middle East and Africa (SEMEA)
Southeastern Europe, Middle East and Africa (SEEMEA)
Central and Eastern Europe (CEE)
Central Europe, Middle East and Africa (CEMEA)
The Middle East and Africa (MEA)
The Middle East and North Africa (MENA)
The Middle East, Turkey and Africa (META)
The Middle East, North Africa, Afghanistan and Pakistan (MENAP)
Europe and the Middle East (EME)
Europe, the Middle East and North Africa (EUMENA or EMENA)
Europe, the Middle East, India and Africa (EMEIA or EMIA)
Europe, the Middle East, Africa and Russia (EMEAR)
Europe, the Middle East, Africa and Commonwealth of Independent States (EMEACIS)
Europe, the Middle East, Africa and Caribbean (EMEAC)
The Commonwealth of Independent States (CIS), around the Black Sea and Caspian Sea
North Atlantic and Central Europe (NACE)
Central and Eastern Europe, the Middle East and Africa (CEMA)
Europe, Latin America, Africa, Arab world

Component areas
The EMEA region generally includes:

Europe

Eastern Europe

Northern Europe

Southern Europe

Western Europe

MENA

Sub-Saharan Africa

Eastern Africa

Central Africa

Southern Africa

Western Africa

See also
Americas
Asia-Pacific
MENA
List of country groupings

References

 
Economic geography
Regions of Eurasia
Regions of Africa